Jordana Brewster (born April 26, 1980) is a Panamanian-American actress. Best known for her role as Mia Toretto in the Fast & Furious franchise, she made her acting debut in an episode of All My Children in 1995 and next took on the recurring role as Nikki Munson in As the World Turns, garnering a nomination for Outstanding Teen Performer at the 1997 Soap Opera Digest Award. Her first role in a feature film was in Robert Rodriguez's horror science fiction The Faculty (1998).

Her breakthrough came with her role of Mia Toretto in the action film The Fast and the Furious (2001). She reprised the role in its sequels Fast & Furious (2009), Fast Five (2011), Fast & Furious 6 (2013), Furious 7 (2015), and F9 (2021). Other film credits include the drama The Invisible Circus (2001), the action comedy D.E.B.S. (2004) and the horror film The Texas Chainsaw Massacre: The Beginning (2006).

Brewster starred on the re-booted TNT series Dallas from 2012 to 2014. She also had a five-episode arc as Denise Brown in the first season of the FX true crime anthology series American Crime Story (2016). She recently starred as Dr. Maureen Cahill on the Fox buddy cop action dramedy Lethal Weapon (2016–2018).

Early life
Jordana Brewster was born in Panama City, Panama, on April 26, 1980, the older of two daughters. Her mother, Maria João ( Leal de Sousa), is a former swimsuit model from Brazil who appeared on the 1978 cover of Sports Illustrated, and her father, Alden Brewster, is an American investment banker. Her paternal grandfather, Kingman Brewster Jr., was president of Yale University (1963–77) and the United States Ambassador to the United Kingdom (1977–81). Brewster is a direct descendant of Mayflower passengers William Brewster and Edward Doty. Jordana lived in London, England and moved to Brazil when she was six years old. She left Brazil at 10, settling in Manhattan, New York City, where she studied at the Convent of the Sacred Heart and graduated from the Professional Children's School. Brewster graduated from Yale University with a B. A. in English Literature in 2003.

Career

1990s
Brewster made her debut in daytime soap operas, with a one-time appearance on All My Children as Anita Santos. She next played the recurring role of rebellious daughter Nikki Munson on As the World Turns. From 1995 to 2001, she appeared in a total of 104 episodes of the soap opera. For her performance, she was nominated for Outstanding Teen Performer at the 1997 Soap Opera Digest Awards. Her first film role was in Robert Rodriguez's horror science fiction film The Faculty (1998), written by Kevin Williamson and co-starring Elijah Wood, Josh Hartnett, and Clea DuVall. In the film about strange occurrences involving the teachers of an Ohio high school, Brewster played a popular vindictive cheerleading captain and an editor in chief of the student paper. The film received mixed reviews, but grossed US$40 million in North America. In 1999, she appeared opposite Julia Stiles and Jerry O'Connell in an NBC television miniseries entitled The '60s, playing a student activist.

2000s

Brewster starred with Cameron Diaz and Christopher Eccleston in the independent drama The Invisible Circus (2001), portraying a grieving teenage girl who travels to Europe in 1976 in search of answers to the suicide of her older sister. The film premiered at the Sundance Film Festival and received a limited theatrical release. The New York Times felt that Brewster "can't summon a credible range of emotion" in her portrayal. Her breakthrough came afterward in 2001, when she took on the role of Mia Toretto opposite Vin Diesel and Paul Walker in the street racing action film The Fast and the Furious. As she did not have a driver's license, she took driving lessons during production. Todd McCarthy of Variety, in his review for the film, noted that Brewster did a "better job here than she did as a searching teen in the recent The Invisible Circus." The film was a commercial success, grossing over US$207 million worldwide.

Following the release of The Fast and the Furious, Brewster took a break from acting to complete her B. A. in English at Yale from which she graduated in 2003. She returned to the screen when she played as a lesbian criminal mastermind in the action comedy D.E.B.S. (2004). A.V. Club dismissed the development of Brewster on-screen relationship with co-star Sara Foster, writing that "D.E.B.S. oscillates between the glib camp smirkiness of its half-hearted action send-up and the thudding earnestness of its romance". It was distributed in limited release. She starred as the love interest of a high school student in the 1970s in the independent teen drama Nearing Grace (2005), which was screened at the Los Angeles Film Festival.

Brewster appeared in the drama Annapolis (2006), directed by Justin Lin and starring James Franco and Tyrese Gibson. In the film, she played a Midshipman 2nd Class named Ali, and the love interest of a man attending the United States Naval Academy. Annapolis was panned by critics and grossed US$7.7 million in its opening weekend, described as "uninspired" by Box Office Mojo. Brewster next starred in the slasher horror The Texas Chainsaw Massacre: The Beginning (2006), opposite Diora Baird, Taylor Handley, and Matt Bomer. The film saw the four actors portray friends driving across Texas who are taken captive by the Hewitt family. Despite largely negative reviews, the film made US$51 million worldwide. For her performance, Brewster was nominated for both Choice Movie Actress: Horror–Thriller and Choice Movie: Scream at the 2007 Teen Choice Awards.

Brewster had a four-episode arc between 2008 and 2009 on the NBC television series Chuck, as Jill Roberts, the title character's ex-girlfriend from Stanford. She returned to the role of Mia Toretto in Fast & Furious (2009), the fourth film of the Fast & Furious franchise. On the growth of her character over the course of the series, Brewster explained in an interview with AskMen.com, "In the first one I'm more of a wallflower and it's much more of a girlfriend-type role, but in [the new movie] I'm more of a woman. She's far more tough. I deal with the repercussions of living in my brother's world." The film earned negative reviews upon its premiere, but was a box office success, grossing US$363 million globally.

2010s

In 2010, Brewster made a three-episode appearance in Dark Blue, playing an art gallery dealer named Maria, and guest-starred in two episodes of Gigantic. She reprised the role of Mia in the fifth film in the series, Fast Five (2011), which making a departure from the street racing theme, revolves around Diesel, Walker and Brewster's characters as they plan a heist to steal a fortune from a corrupt businessman in Brazil. Critical response toward Fast Five was positive while it earned US$86 million in its North American opening weekend and US$626.1 million worldwide. In 2012, Brewster starred as Elena Ramos, on Dallas, an updated version of CBS's original series of the same name (1978–1991) about the trials and tribulations of a wealthy Texas family. The series was met with an overall positive response and aired until 2014.

She played Mia Toretto for the fourth time in Fast & Furious 6 (2013), which follows the remaining wanted fugitives on the heist from Fast Five. The film earned a worldwide total of US$789 million. She returned for the next instalment, Furious 7 (2015), which was the final film appearance of Walker, who died in a single-vehicle accident while filming was only half-completed. After Walker's death, filming was delayed for script rewrites to the story arcs for both Walker and Brewster's characters, causing them to be retired. The highest-grossing film in the franchise, it grossed US$397.6 million worldwide during its opening weekend and US$1.5 billion worldwide. She next appeared in the independent action drama American Heist (2014), as the girlfriend of a man involved in a crime. It screened at the Toronto International Film Festival and premiered in a ten-theater run in North America. Brewster also played a young and flirtatious salesperson named Dusty in the dark comedy Home Sweet Hell (2015), released for VOD and selected theaters.

In 2016, she took on the recurring role of Denise Brown, the sister of Nicole Brown Simpson, in The People v. O. J. Simpson, the first season of the true crime anthology series American Crime Story, revolving around the infamous O. J. Simpson murder case. A "giant fan" of executive producer Ryan Murphy, she remarked about obtaining the role: "I heard they were making it and I always felt like my aunt actually really looked a lot like Denise Brown, so my manager and I took a side-by-side photo edit of me and Denise and we fought really hard for it. We just fought to get that show". Also in 2016, she signed on to play the regular role of Dr. Maureen Cahill, a Los Angeles Police Department psychologist, on the FOX buddy cop action dramedy Lethal Weapon and starred in the second season of the ABC anthology crime drama Secrets and Lies as Kate Warner. After not appearing in 2017's The Fate of the Furious, Brewster returned as Mia Toretto in the ninth instalment of the franchise, 2021's F9. Her older son Julian also performed in F9 with a small role.

Media and public image

In 2002, Stuff magazine named her the 96th hottest woman in their "102 Sexiest Women in the World". In 2005, Maxim magazine named her the 54th sexiest woman in the world in their annual Hot 100, while in 2006, Maxim placed her at No.59. In 2009, she was ranked No.9 on Maxim'''s Hot 100 and, to coincide with the release of Fast and Furious, a photographic spread of Brewster in a range of black lingerie in their May 2009 edition ("Life in the Fast Lane"). In 2011, Maxim placed Brewster at No.11 in their Hot 100.

In 2015, Brewster posed nude for the May issue of Allure magazine – alongside Laverne Cox, Nicole Beharie, Katheryn Winnick, and Sandrine Holt.

In June 2016, the Human Rights Campaign released a video in tribute to the victims of the Orlando nightclub shooting; in the video, Brewster and others told the stories of the people killed there.

 Personal life 
Brewster and film and television producer Andrew Form met on the set of The Texas Chainsaw Massacre: The Beginning'', which Form produced. They announced their engagement on November 4, 2006, and married in the Bahamas on May 6, 2007. They have two sons born via surrogacy: Julian, born in September 2013 and Rowan, born in June 2016. Brewster filed for divorce in mid-2020. The divorce was finalized in June 2021. She married ValueAct Capital CEO Mason Morfit on September 3, 2022 in California.

Filmography

Film

Television

Music videos

Awards and nominations

References

External links

 
 
 Official website (archived)

1980 births
Living people
20th-century American actresses
21st-century American actresses
Actresses from New York City
Actresses from Rio de Janeiro (city)
Actresses of Brazilian descent
American child actresses
American film actresses
American people of Brazilian descent
American people of English descent
American people of Portuguese descent
American soap opera actresses
American television actresses
Convent of the Sacred Heart (NYC) alumni
People from Manhattan
People from Panama City
Panamanian people of Brazilian descent
Panamanian people of American descent
Schools of the Sacred Heart alumni
Yale College alumni
American expatriates in England
Panamanian expatriates in the United Kingdom